Mount Yale is a high and prominent mountain summit of the Collegiate Peaks in the Sawatch Range of the Rocky Mountains of North America. The mountain was named in honor of Elihu Yale, the primary benefactor of what is now Yale University.

Geography
The term "Collegiate Peaks" comes from some of its individual peaks, which are named after universities, including Mount Harvard, Mount Princeton, Mount Oxford, Mount Columbia, and Mount Yale itself. Much of the upper part of the mountain is covered in scree and boulder fields.

History
Mount Yale was first climbed by a research team from Harvard University led by Josiah Whitney. The group named the taller Mount Harvard (14,420 ft) after their own university and the shorter Mount Yale after Whitney's alma mater.

Due to the similarity in heights of Mount Princeton and Mount Yale (Princeton is  higher), it was once a tradition for the alumni of each school to carry rocks to the top of their respective mountain in order to add to the stone pyramid built at the summit. The graduates used these rock towers to ensure their mountain was the tallest.

Hiking
Mount Yale has achieved great popularity as a non-technical fourteener. The mountain offers fantastic views of the Sawatch Range and Buena Vista, and is a favorite "training" mountain for those wishing to tackle more difficult fourteeners later in the season.

The standard route for climbing Mount Yale was once Denny Gulch, but overuse turned the trail into both a safety and environmental issue. The Denny Gulch trailhead was closed by the Forest Service for restoration, and now most hikers use the nearby Denny Creek Trailhead to begin their hike.

The climb up Mount Yale is generally considered to be a mid-level hike. With a 9.5 mile out and back trail and 4,300 ft elevation gain, it is not for the beginner.

See also

List of mountain peaks of North America
List of mountain peaks of the United States
List of mountain peaks of Colorado
List of Colorado fourteeners

References

External links
Mt. Yale on 14ers.com

Yale
Yale
San Isabel National Forest
Yale
Yale